Sidney Myer Aronovitz (June 20, 1920 – January 8, 1997) was an American lawyer and United States district judge of the United States District Court for the Southern District of Florida.

Education and career

Born on June 20, 1920 in Key West, Florida, Aronovitz was the son of a local textile merchant and a third-generation Key West native. He graduated from Key West High School in 1937, valedictorian and president of his class. He received his Bachelor of Arts degree from the University of Florida in 1942 and his Juris Doctor from the Fredric G. Levin College of Law at the University of Florida in 1943. Aronovitz served in the United States Army as a Captain from 1943 to 1946, winning the Bronze Star. He was in private practice in Miami, Florida from 1946 to 1976, serving as a Miami city commissioner from 1962 to 1966 and as vice-mayor in 1965.

Federal judicial service

President Gerald Ford nominated Aronovitz to the United States District Court for the Southern District of Florida on August 4, 1976, to the seat vacated by Judge William O. Mehrtens. He was confirmed by the United States Senate on September 17, 1976, he received his commission four days later. Aronovitz assumed senior status on October 31, 1988 and remained on the court until his death in Miami on January 8, 1997.

Notable case

Among the cases presided over by Aronovitz was the claim of treasure hunter Mel Fisher to the Spanish galleon, Atocha.

Honor

In October 2009, President Barack Obama signed into a law a bill introduced by Representative Ileana Ros-Lehtinen to rename the United States Post Office, Custom House, and Courthouse in Key West the Sidney M. Aronovitz United States Courthouse.

See also
 List of Jewish American jurists

References

External links

Profile from the University of Florida College of Law

1920 births
1997 deaths
People from Key West, Florida
Judges of the United States District Court for the Southern District of Florida
United States district court judges appointed by Gerald Ford
20th-century American judges
University of Florida alumni
United States Army officers
Judges of the United States Foreign Intelligence Surveillance Court
Fredric G. Levin College of Law alumni
United States Army personnel of World War II